Cyril II served as Greek Orthodox Patriarchs of Alexandria in the 12th century (exact dates are unknown).

References

12th-century Patriarchs of Alexandria
12th-century Christian saints
Melkites in the Fatimid Caliphate